Next Byte Codes (NBC) is a simple language with an assembly language syntax that can be used to program Lego Mindstorms NXT programmable bricks.  The command line compiler outputs NXT compatible machine code, and is supported on Windows, Mac OS and Linux.  It is maintained by John Hansen, a Mindstorms Developer Program member.

The NBC compiler is released under the Mozilla Public License. The integrated development environment (IDE) is Bricx Command Center.

The NBC debugger was developed by SorosyDotCom and can be downloaded as freeware.

References

External links
 
 
 Robotics lecture using NBC

Assembly languages
Lego Mindstorms
Robot programming languages